Spring Creek is a stream in southeastern Franklin County in the U.S. state of Missouri. It is a tributary of Bourbeuse River.

The stream flows north passing west of the Long Ridge Conservation Area three miles east of Spring Bluff. It turns northeast to its confluence with the Bourbeuse at  approximately four miles north of Stanton. The stream gains the water of two named springs, Sour Spring west of the conservation area and Kratz Spring north of the conservation area.

Spring Creek was named for the fact its flow is increased by springs along its course.

See also
List of rivers of Missouri

References

Rivers of Franklin County, Missouri
Rivers of Missouri